Aldo Arcangioli (born 28 July 1969 in Castellammare di Stabia) is an Italian businessperson, video producer and sustainable mobility advocate.

Biography 
In 2004, Arcangioli founded Charterbay LLC, a maritime services start-up in Dubai.

In 2006, Arcangioli co-produced the film I, the Other, which was nominated for a 2007 David di Donatello.

He was the founder of start-up Emotion in 2013, a Neapolitan company operating in the field of electric mobility.

On 4 February 2019, he received the "Assotutela" 2018/2019 award for Italian Excellence at the Senate of the Republic. Also in 2019, Arcangioli was executive producer for the music video for the song Dimane, e mo by Andrea Sannino.

In 2020, researcher Luigi Maria Pepe and Arcangioli produced an article about renewable energy in Italy.

In 2021, he served president of the Ischia Global Film & Music Festival. Also in 2021, Arcangioli was a guest of a festival called Los Angeles, Italia – Film, Fashion and Art Fest. and his company provided lighting for an event one evening promoting skin checks for melanoma.

Arcangioli has worked as a diplomatic and commercial advisor for Sheikh Falah bin Zayed Al Nahyan.

References

1969 births
Living people
Businesspeople from Naples
People from Castellammare di Stabia